Kevin Janssens (born 21 August 1979) is a Belgian-born big-screen, television, and stage actor.

Early life and education
Janssens was born in Antwerp, Belgium on 21 August 1979. He studied under Guido Henderickx at Studio Herman Teirlinck in Antwerp, graduating in 2003.

Career

In 2006, at age 27, Janssens played the lead role in the film (and preceding television series), King of the World, which was shot in Cuba; he also starred in Hans Herbots' Stormforce that was released in that year.

Janssens costarred alongside Matilda Anna Ingrid Lutz in Coralie Fargeat's Revenge (2017), which premiered at the Toronto Film Festival, was given a mise-en-scene award at Sitges, and was given a Midnight session slot at Sundance in 2018. He has more recently appeared alongside Olga Kurylenko in Christian Volckman's 2019 horror film, The Room.

As of 2022. Janssens had made more than 40 appearances on the big and small screen.

Janssens' stage work includes his 2007 appearance and touring in a production of Pushkin’s Eugene Onegin.

Awards and honors
Janssens was Belgium's nominee for Europe's Shooting Star award in 2007. He was nominated for the Magritte Award for Best Actor for his portrayal of the title character in Patrick in 2019.

An image of Janssens shot with a Nikon D850 by Pieter Clicteur during Filmfestival Oostende was a submission to the 17th Annual Smithsonian Magazine Photo Contest.

Selected filmography

Feature films and shorts
As of 2022, Janssens had appeared in more than twenty films.

Television

As of 2022, Janssens had appeared in more than twenty television series.

References

Further reading
 Filmography list at CineNews.be.
 Actor entry at Burie Burie talent.
  Filmography and news at Cineuropa.org.

External links 

1979 births
Living people
Belgian male film actors